Sussex Academic Press, founded in 1994, is a publishing company based in Eastbourne, East Sussex, United Kingdom. It initially specialised in Middle East studies.

The house published books on issues of contemporary relevance and debate in Middle East topics, Theology & Religion, History (especially Portuguese, Spanish and Huguenot history), and Literary Criticism, as well as Latin American, First Nations, and Asian studies.

Its series on the Portuguese-Speaking World: Its History, Politics and Culture is under the editorship of António Costa Pinto, Onésimo T. Almeida and Miguel Bandeira Jerónimo.

In 2922, Liverpool University Press (LUP) announced its acquisition of Sussex Academic Press as part of its digital publishing strategy, allowing it access to Sussex Academic Press's 1,000-book backlist.

Authors and publications

 Bel, Germà (2012): Infrastructure and the political economy of nation building in Spain 1720–2010

 Blocksidge, Martin (2013): The banker poet: the rise and fall of Samuel Rogers, 1763-1855

 Britton, R. K. (2019): Don Quixote and the Subversive Tradition of Golden Age Spain

 Graham, Helen (2014): The War and Its Shadow: Spain's Civil War in Europe's Long Twentieth Century

 Jordan, Bill (2001): Who Cares for Planet Earth?: The Con in Conservation

 Laskier, Michael M. & Ronen Yitzhak (2023): Israel and the Mediterranean: Five Decades of Uneasy Coexistence

 Lowe, Sid (2010). Catholicism, War and the Foundation of Francoism: The Juventud De Acción Popular in Spain, 1931-1939

 Petersen, Tore T. (2009): Richard Nixon, Great Britain and the Anglo-American Alignment in the Persian Gulf and Arabian Peninsula: Making Allies out of Clients

 Shapira, Anita et al. (2014): The Nation State and Immigration

 Smith, Donna (2012): Sex, Lies and Politics: Gay Politicians and the Press

 Townson, Nigel, ed. (2015): Is Spain Different? A Comparative Look at the 19th and 20th Centuries

 Vigne, Randolph & Charles Littleton (2001): From Strangers to Citizens: The Integration of Immmigrant Communities in Britain, Ireland and Colonial America, 1550–1750

References

1994 establishments in England
Book publishing companies of the United Kingdom
British companies established in 1994
Publishing companies established in 1994